Baniéré Koré is a commune and village in the Cercle of Nioro in the Kayes Region of south-western Mali.

References

External links
.

Communes of Kayes Region